Petter Salsten (born 11 March 1965) is a Norwegian ice hockey player, coach and sports official. He played for the Norwegian national ice hockey team, and  participated at the Winter Olympics in 1988, 1992, and 1994. He played for the clubs Furuset, AIK in Stockholm, Sweden, and Storhamar, and was Norwegian champion in 1990, 1995, 1996, 1997 and 2000. He was awarded Gullpucken as best Norwegian ice hockey player in 1988 and 1997.

References

External links

1965 births
Living people
Ice hockey people from Oslo
Norwegian ice hockey defencemen
Olympic ice hockey players of Norway
Ice hockey players at the 1988 Winter Olympics
Ice hockey players at the 1992 Winter Olympics
Ice hockey players at the 1994 Winter Olympics
Norwegian ice hockey coaches
AIK IF players
Furuset Ishockey players
Storhamar Dragons players
Storhamar Dragons coaches
Norwegian expatriate ice hockey people